The Kakhovskaya line (Line 11A, formerly Line 11) was an abolished line of the Moscow Metro. Although the line was formed in 1995, all of the stations date to 1969 when they opened as part of the Zamoskvoretskaya line. The Kakhovskaya line was the only conventional line that lacked a full transfer to the ring line.

History
The history of this small line begins in the Moscow urban development plan that was adopted in the early 1960s. The plan focused on extending the Zamoskvoretsky radius of the then Gorkovsko–Zamoskvoretskaya line (GZL) to the south. Using the ideal of simplified singular architectural pillar-trispan station design (sorokonozhka) that was prominent at the time, construction began in the mid 1960s of extending the Metro past the Kolomenskoye nature reserve and Nagatino industrial zone up to the station of Kashirskaya and then splitting into two directions one into the rapidly growing districts of Saburovo and Zyuzino and the other one into the future districts of Orekhovo and Borisovo. The former branch was to open as part of the extension and would feature a new depot, whilst the second branch would remain in perspective for a decade more whilst the latter districts were being built. It was the feature of the first (Kakhovskaya) branch that made the whole line appear unlike the standard layout that Moscow Metro radii, which follow a more or less tangential path to the central ring, instead after Kashirskaya the line becomes almost parallel.

Although it was a practical reason, as the stations of the Kakhovskaya line connect three major transport arteries, the Kashira Highway which continues on to become the M4 (E111) motorway going southwards to the Caucasus; the Varshava highway, although named after Warsaw, its direction is actually southwards as the M2 (E105) towards Ukraine and Crimea. In addition the line also crosses the Paveletsky direction railway. Thereby the unorthodox layout was justified in its transport importance. In addition most of the residents who were settled in the districts which the line expanded into were families of workers of the Likhachev Factory Plant (ZiL), the largest in Moscow, who aided the construction of the Metro so that the residents would have a direct transport to work via Avtozavodskaya station. However the most inspiring reasons of all would be the actual development plan itself rather than the practical reasons. The plan had a very ambitious project that coincided with the traditional radial layout of Moscow - to feature a second parallel ring that would allow passengers to bypass the city centre altogether, and in the future the stations of the Kakhovskaya line would become part of it.

The line formally opened in August 1969 and for more than a decade the operation was continuous. However, by the early 1980s the future districts of Orekhovo and Zyablikovo were actively growing and were in desperate need of a Metro, thus construction began on the second branch. However the original idea was that upon the completion of the second, longer branch, the Kakhovskaya would close and remain closed until the large ring would be complete. On December 30, 1984 the Orekhovo branch was opened, and the Kakhovskaya was closed.

And on December 31, 1984 the Orekhovo branch was closed and Kakhovskaya was reopened. A flood in the new tunnel forced the closure of the new stations, and the extensive insistence of ZiL convinced the city authorities not to close the shorter branch. This however created a number of problems. One of which was the track arrangement at Kashirskaya where the southbound trains directions' separate only after the station, not before, thus preventing proper use of the cross-platform ability. Moreover, the new branch resulted in massive rise of passengers, and the 2:1 ratio was not enough to deal with the more important Orekhovo passengers.

In early 1995 construction was completed on the reversal sidings behind Kashirskaya and finally the Kakhovskaya branch was separated into separate a formal line. This took place on August 11, 1995.

Since March 2019, Kakhovskaya station has been closed temporarily for construction of the connection with phase 2 of Bolshaya Koltsevaya line from Kashirskaya to Mnyovniki. Kakhovskaya line was integrated into and is operated as the Bolshaya Koltsevaya line from March 2023.

Timeline

* Prior to 1995 and was integral part of Zamoskvoretskaya line

Transfers

Rolling stock
The line shares the Zamoskvoretskoye depot (№ 7) with the Zamoskvoretskaya line, and four 81-717/714.

References

External links 

Kakhovskaya Line on the UrbanRail.Net

Moscow Metro lines
Railway lines opened in 1995
Kakhovskaya Line
Railway lines closed in 2019